Boaz Mountain is a summit in the U.S. state of Oregon.

Boaz Mountain was named in 1879 after Kinder Boaz, a pioneer citizen.

References

Mountains of Jackson County, Oregon
Mountains of Oregon